is a former Japanese football player.

Playing career
Habata was born in Kinokawa on July 22, 1983. He joined J1 League club Gamba Osaka from youth team in 2002. On August 7, he debuted as substitute forward against Tokyo Verdy. He also played next match against Consadole Sapporo. However he could only play these 2 matches. In 2004, he moved to J2 League club Sagan Tosu. In 2005, he moved to Regional Leagues club Shizuoka FC. From 2006, he played for Prefectural Leagues club Kindai Wakayama FC (2006), Arterivo Wakayama (2007–2008) and FC Osaka (2008–2009). He retired end of 2009 season.

Club statistics

References

External links

1983 births
Living people
Association football people from Wakayama Prefecture
Japanese footballers
J1 League players
J2 League players
Gamba Osaka players
Sagan Tosu players
FC Osaka players
Association football forwards